The Ministry of Public Works (MOP) of Argentina is a ministry of the national executive power that oversees and advises on the elaboration and maintenance of roadways, urban and hydraulic infrastructure and other types of public works.

From 2003 to 2015 it was known as the Ministry of Federal Planning, Public Investment and Services; it was reorganized as a secretariat of the Interior Ministry during the 2015–2019 presidency of Mauricio Macri, and reinstated as a ministry with its original name in 2019 under President Alberto Fernández. The current minister of public works is Gabriel Katopodis, who has served since 10 December 2019.

Attributions
As established by the ruling Ley de Ministerios ("Ministries Law"), adopted in December 2019, the Ministry of Public Works was reinstated (from having previously been part of the Interior Ministry's portfolio) due to the "importance of counting with a centralized organ to co-ordinate the national government's policy on public works and hydraulic infrastructure.

The Ministry's responsibilities and attributions are outlined in Article 21 of the current law, which states that, among others, it is within the ministry's competence overseeing the design and execution of plans and programs pertaining to public works and infrastructure on an international, national, regional, provincial and municipal level; co-ordinating these policies alongside the provincial governments and the government of the Autonomous City of Buenos Aires, intervening in the construction and fiscalization of transport (roads, airports and sea and river ports) and hydraulic infrastructure; and co-ordinating and executing the necessary public works to ensure civil protection of Argentina's inhabitants, as well as creating and upkeeping policies and regulations on public services within the competent areas, among others.

Structure and dependencies
As of 2019 the Ministry of Public Works is organized into the following centralized dependencies:

Secretariat of Administrative Management (Secretaría de Gestión Administrativa)
Secretariat of Public Works (Secretaría de Obras Públicas)
Undersecretariat of Planning and Territorial Co-ordination for Public Works (Subsecretaría de Planificación y Coordinación Territorial de la Obra Pública)
Undersecretariat of Public Works Execution (Subsecretaría de Ejecución de Obra Pública)
Secretariat of Hydraulic Infrastructure and Policy (Secretaría de Infraestructura y Política Hídrica)
Undersecretariat of Hydraulic Works (Subsecretaría de Obras Hidráulicas)
Undersecretariat of Operational Management for Hydraulic Projects (Subsecretaría de Gestión Operativa de Proyectos Hídricos)

Additionally, a number of decentralized dependencies also report to the Ministry of Public Works, including the National Directorate of Roads (DNV), the National Hydraulic Works and Sanitation Authority (ENOHSA), the National Water Institute (INA), the National Institute of Seismic Prevention (INPRES), the National Regulatory Dam Safety Authority (ORSEP). Several state-owned enterprises are also overseen by the Ministry of Public Works, such as AySA and ACUMAR, the Matanza–Riachuelo River Basin Authority.

Headquarters
The Ministry of Public Works is headquartered in the Palacio de Hacienda ("Palace of the Treasury"), located in the Monserrat barrio in Buenos Aires, which has historically housed the Ministry of Economy (formerly known as the Ministry of the Treasury) as well as other ministerial portfolios such as transport and production. The building was built in two stages from 1937 to 1950 and stands on Hipólito Yrigoyen street, across from the emblematic Plaza de Mayo square and the Casa Rosada, seat of the Presidency.

From 1936 to 1991 the Ministry of Public Works was housed in the iconic Ministry of Public Works Building (Edificio del Ministerio de Obras Públicas), located on 9 de Julio Avenue in downtown Buenos Aires, which is famous for its large steel image of Eva Perón. Nowadays the building houses the Health Ministry, but it is still sometimes known by its former name.

List of ministers

References

External links
 

Public Works
Infrastructure in Argentina
Argentina
1898 establishments in Argentina
Argentina